Joel Mark Bowman is the Samuel Candler Dobbs Professor of Theoretical Chemistry at Emory University.  He is the author of more than 500 publications, a member of the International Academy of Quantum Molecular Sciences, and a fellow of the American Physical Society and of the American Association for the Advancement of Science.  His research interests are in basic theories of chemical reactivity; his AAAS fellow citation cited him “for distinguished contributions to 
reduced dimensionality quantum approaches to reaction rates and to the formulation and application of self-consistent field approaches to molecular vibrations.” Several of his recent papers have appeared in the journal Science.

Selected publications
.
.
.
.
 Vibrational Dynamics of Molecules, World Scientific Publishing, 2022.

References

External links
Bowman's home page at Emory

Living people
Year of birth missing (living people)
21st-century American chemists
Fellows of the American Physical Society
Fellows of the American Association for the Advancement of Science